Lazić is a Serbian surname. Notable people with the surname include:

Boban Lazić (born 1994), Bosnian-Dutch professional footballer
Bojan Lazić (born 1974), professional Serbian football player
Borivoj Lazić (1939–2015), Serbian scientist and professor at the Institution of Electrical Engineering at the University of Belgrade
Branko Lazić (born 1989), Serbian professional basketball player
Darko Lazić (singer) (born 1991), popular Serbian singer
Darko Lazić (footballer) (born 1994), Serbian football defender
Dejan Lazić (born 1977), Croatian pianist and composer, and a naturalised Austrian citizen
Đorđe Lazić (footballer) (born 1983), Serbian professional footballer
Đorđe Lazić (water polo) (born 1996), Serbian water polo player
Igor Lazić (footballer, born 1967) (born 1967), Bosnian former footballer
Igor Lazić (ice hockey) (born 1992), Croatian ice hockey player
Jugoslav Lazić (born 1979), Serbian football goalkeeper
Katarina Lazić (born 1980), former Yugoslavian and Serbian female basketball player
Milan Lazić (born 1982), Serbian football defender
Nemanja Lazić (footballer, born April 1990), Serbian football midfielder
Nemanja Lazić (footballer, born March 1990), Serbian football midfielder
Predrag Lazić (born 1982), Serbian footballer
Radivoj Lazić (born 1953), musician, clarinettist, pedagogue, composer, painter and children's writer
Slađana Pop-Lazić (born 1988), Serbian female handball player
Viktor Lazić (born 1985), one of Serbia's most well known modern travel writers
Vladimir Lazić (born 1984), Serbian futsal player
Vlatko Lazić (born 1989), Dutch professional footballer
Zorica Lazić in Veliki brat 2007, the Serbian, Bosnian and Montenegrin version of Big Brother

See also
Lazic War or Colchidian War, fought between the East Roman (Byzantine) Empire and the Sassanid Empire
Lazi (disambiguation)
Lazica

Serbian surnames
Patronymic surnames
Surnames from given names